Hendrickus Cornelius "Henk" van Lijnschooten (28 March 1928 in The Hague - 1 November 2006 in Hendrik-Ido-Ambacht)  was a Dutch composer, who also wrote under the names Ted Huggens and Michel van Delft.

Life 
Henk van Lijnschooten went to his local music school for violin and clarinet lessons. His initial studies were with Koeberg Fritz (1876-1961) in music theory, composition and conducting technique. He completed his training as the Concert Band Conductor of The Hague Royal Conservatory. In 1957 he was appointed as the successor to the conductor of the Marine Band of the Royal Dutch Navy. With this orchestra he traveled throughout Europe and the United States. From 1965 to 1970 he was professor of woodwinds at the Conservatory of Rotterdam. After that, he taught at the Conservatory Concert Directorate in Arnhem and the Rotterdam Conservatory. In 1985 he was decorated as Knight of the Order of Orange-Nassau.

Works for Wind Orchestra

Works of Ted Huggens

Works of Michiel van Delft 
 1970 With Horns and Trumpets for horn Corps
 1970 Nicolette for marching band
 1970 Dialogue for drum corps
 1972 Serenade for Michel
 1972 Rag 2000
 1976 Rock The Wonderful Machine
 1984 Fantasy on the Old Hundredth
 1985 Easy Tune for the Young Ones
 1986 Overture über einen Spiritual

Chamber music 
 Canon 1950, for two clarinets
 Fughetta 1950, for brass quartet
 1967 Variations on a Flemish folk song, for brass quartet
 1969 Capriccio, for recorders
 1969 Mini Concerto for horn and brass quartet
 1969 Music for young blazers
 Chorale prelude, for horn quartet
 Music, for horn and percussion (vibraphone, temple blocks, marimba, bongos, drums, hi-hat, congas, glockenspiel)

Works for accordion 
 1970 rhapsodic Three miniatures for accordion orchestra
 1975 Various pieces for accordion
 Three Folk Sketches, for accordion orchestra

Works for plucked instruments 
 1967 Second Rhapsody from the Low Countries, for mandolin orchestra

Soundtracks 
 1964 Acqua di Roma
 1966 Refugee Film
 1967 Marine Corps

References

1928 births
2006 deaths
Dutch composers
Musicians from The Hague
Musicians from Hendrik-Ido-Ambacht